"One Moment in Time" is a song sung by Whitney Houston.

One Moment in Time may also refer to:

One Moment in Time (comics), a Spider-Man storyline
1988 Summer Olympics Album: One Moment in Time, an album

See also 
A Moment in Time (disambiguation)